Skills for a New Technology: What a Kid Needs is an educational series of three live action short films produced in 1982 by Walt Disney Educational films to explain physical fitness.

1983
Skills for a New Technology: What a Kid Needs to Know Today (September 1983):
Basic Communication Skills
Change Living With a guard learns that change can bring benefits
Living With Computers guard tells the computer applications
 Computer language is developing

References 

Disney documentary films
Disney educational films
Disney short film series
1982 films
1980s educational films
1980s American films